Grigore I Ghica (1628 – 1675), a member of the Ghica family, was Prince of Wallachia between September 1660 and December 1664 and again between March 1672 and November 1673.

His father was George Ghica, ruler of Moldavia (1658–59) and ruler of Wallachia (1659–60).

He married Maria, daughter of Matei Sturdza.

His son was 
 Matei Ghica, father of 
 Grigore II Ghica and 
 Alexandru Ghica, father of
 Grigore III Ghica and
 Ecaterina Ghica. Her great-grandson is Grigore Alexandru Ghica.

In 1661 he established a monastery in Focșani.

References

External links 
 Grigore Ghika: ancestors and descendants

Ghica family
Rulers of Moldavia
Rulers of Wallachia
17th-century rulers in Europe
Romanian people of Albanian descent
Founders of Christian monasteries
1628 births
1675 deaths